Attorney General Bell may refer to:

John C. Bell (lawyer) (1861–1935), Attorney General of Pennsylvania
Francis Bell (New Zealand politician) (1851–1936), Attorney-General of New Zealand
Charles K. Bell (1853–1913), Attorney General of Texas
Griffin Bell (1918–2009), Attorney General of the United States

See also
General Bell (disambiguation)